The women's artistic gymnastics all-around final at the 2019 European Games was held at the Minsk Arena on June 29.

Qualification 

Qualification took place on June 27. Angelina Melnikova from Russia qualified in first, followed by Great Britain's Georgia-Mae Fenton and Lorette Charpy of France.

The reserves were:

Medalists

Results 
Oldest and youngest competitors

References

Gymnastics at the 2019 European Games